Eric Ayiah (born 6 March 2000) is a Ghanaian professional footballer who plays as a forward for Gil Vicente in the Championnat National 2. He is a former captain of the Ghana U-17 Team. He was included in The Guardian's "Next Generation 2017".

Early  and personal life 
Ayiah attended Fomena T.I. Ahmadiyya Senior High for his secondary school education. Whilst playing for the Ghana U-17 team, Ayiah wore the number 6 jersey as a tribute to Ghana's Independence Day; 6 March, which is coincidentally also his birthday.

Club career 
Ayiah started his career in his native Ghana with lower-tier side Charity Stars at the age of ten. He rose through the ranks till he was promoted to the senior team who played in the Ghana Division Two League. In August 2018, he secured a move to AS Monaco after his exploits with the Ghana U-17 team at both the 2017 Africa U-17 Cup of Nations and 2017 FIFA U-17 World Cup. He signed a five-year deal with the club.

He was linked with several clubs including Porto, AC Milan and Anderlecht of which he apparently rejected their offers and signed for Monaco.

International career 
Ayiah was the captain for the Ghanaian youth team, the Black Starlets, the Ghana U-17 Team.

He served and played as captain at the 2017 Africa U-17 Cup of Nations where he came up as second top scorer to clinch the silver boot after scoring four goals and guided the Black Starlets to the silver medal at the competition. He also played in the 2017 FIFA U-17 World Cup. He was included in Goal's 10 players to watch out of for at the World Cup. He went he score three goals as Ghana reached the quarter-finals.

In December 2016, he was nominated for the Confederation of African Football (CAF) Youth Player of the year alongside Ghanaian women's footballer Sandra Owusu-Ansah and eventual winner Nigerian footballer Alex Iwobi. He was again nominated for CAF Youth Player of the year award in 2017. The award was eventually won by Zambian footballer Patson Daka.

Career statistics

Club

Honours 
Ghana U-17
 Africa U-17 Cup of Nations  runners up: 2017

Individual
 CAF Youth Player of the year nominee: 2016, 2017

References

External links 
 
 

Living people
2000 births
Ghanaian footballers